The Newport Rugby Football Club are a rugby union club based in Newport, Rhode Island, USA.  Founded in 1980, the club competes in the New England Rugby Football Union Men's Club Division II.

Rugby union teams in Rhode Island